Latinic may refer to:

 adjective form of Latinica, Gaj's Latin alphabet
 adjective form of Latin languages